Two partial lunar eclipses occurred in 1988: 

 3 March 1988 lunar eclipse
 27 August 1988 lunar eclipse

See also 
 List of 20th-century lunar eclipses
 Lists of lunar eclipses